Halloumoti / Hellimli ( "Χαλλουμοτή" Cypriot Greek or Hellim Cypriot Turkish for halloumi, -li Turkish suffix meaning "with")  is a Cypriot savoury pastry made with halloumi cheese.

References

Cypriot cuisine
Pastries
Cheese dishes